The 2006 Michigan House of Representatives elections were held on November 7, 2006, with partisan primaries to select the parties' nominees in the various districts on August 8, 2006.

Results

Districts 1–28

Districts 29–55

Districts 56–83

Districts 84–110

See also
2006 Michigan Senate election

References

House of Representatives
2006
Michigan House of Representatives
November 2006 events in the United States